Vikramarka Vijayam is a 1971 Indian Telugu-language folk film under the direction of Giduturi Suryam. Ramakrishna, S. V. Rangarao and Mannava Balaya played the lead roles.

Cast 
 Ramakrishna
 S. V. Rangarao
 Mannava Balaya
 Vijayanirmala
 Anjali Devi 
 Rajashree

References

External links
 

1970s Telugu-language films
1971 films
Memorials to Vikramaditya